Marcellus Rodríguez-López (born September 29, 1983) is a Puerto Rican multi-instrumentalist musician and younger brother of Omar Rodríguez-López. He is best known as the keyboardist and percussionist of The Mars Volta and the drummer for Zechs Marquise. He also produces electronic music under the moniker Eureka the Butcher.

Biography 
Marcel has been noted as to playing the bongos, congas, drums, cymbals, Maracas, keyboards and shekere.

He formerly played in the band Thieves of Always, which was led by Ralph Jasso, who was a member of The Mars Volta (led by his elder brother Omar) on tour in 2002. Marcel joined The Mars Volta mid-tour in October 2003 at Omar's request as a percussionist. Since then he had been a constant member of The Mars Volta and the Omar Rodriguez-Lopez Group until TMV's dissolution in 2012, contributing percussion and keyboards. He was also a founding member of El Paso band Zechs Marquise, which included his brothers Marfred on bass and Rikardo on keyboards and trumpet; he initially played keyboards and percussion but switched to drums after the band's original drummer left.

Marcel also played live with the Red Hot Chili Peppers in 2006 during their North American tour (for which The Mars Volta was the support act), contributing bongos to "Hump de Bump" and congas to "Charlie." On the final night of the Amputechture / Stadium Arcadium tour, November 5, 2006, Marcel and the RHCP were joined onstage by Omar for the outro jam which went on for over 15 minutes.  Marcel then appeared along with the band for the Gnarls Barkley tour, playing nearly every song of the set, starting with the Dallas show, January 13, through the Sunrise, Florida show on January 31, 2007. Marcel also played clavinet during performances of "Warlocks," which was originally played by Billy Preston on the studio recording of Stadium Arcadium.

In addition Marcel has acted in his brother Omar's film The Sentimental Engine Slayer.

Omar Rodríguez-López spoke out about the relationship with him and his brother:

Discography

Solo (as Eureka the Butcher) 
 Music for Mothers (2013)
 Foreshadowed With Shakes And Cracks (2016)
 ¡EUREKA! (2017)

With The Mars Volta 
 Frances the Mute (2005)
 Scabdates (2005)
 Amputechture (2006)
 The Bedlam in Goliath  (2008)
 Octahedron (2009)
 Noctourniquet (2012) (credited but appears only on live bonus track)
 The Mars Volta (2022)

With Omar Rodríguez-López 
 Omar Rodriguez (2005) (Drums & Percussion, Gong, Keyboards)
 Please Heat This Eventually (2006) (Drums)
 Se Dice Bisonte, No Búfalo (2007) (Drums & Percussion, Synths, Clavinet)
 Omar Rodriguez-Lopez & Lydia Lunch (2007) (Drums & Percussion)
 The Apocalypse Inside of an Orange (2007) (Drums, Percussion, Keyboards)
 Calibration (Is Pushing Luck and Key Too Far) (2007) (Drums & Percussion, Synths, Clavinet)
 Absence Makes the Heart Grow Fungus (2008) (Drums)
 Minor Cuts and Scrapes in the Bushes Ahead (2008) (Drums)
 Old Money (2008) (Drums & Percussion, Synths, Clavinet, Keyboards)
 Megaritual (2009) (Drums & Percussion, Synths, Piano)
 Los Sueños de un Hígado (2009) (Percussion)
 Xenophanes (2009) (Percussion, Keyboards)
 Solar Gambling (2009) (Synths, Piano)
 Sepulcros de Miel (2010) (Drums & Percussion, Synths)
 Tychozorente (2010) (Mellotron)
 Cizaña de los Amores (2010) (Drums, Synths, Piano, Organ)
 Dōitashimashite (2010) (Keyboards)
 Un Escorpión Perfumado (2010) (Synths)
 Octopus Kool Aid (2012) (Drums, Engineering)
 Umbrella Mistress (2016) (Keyboards, Mellotron, Percussion)
 El Bien Y Mal Nos Une (2016) (Synths)
 Weekly Mansions (2016) (Synths, Mellotron, Percussion, Programming, Co-writing, Production, Mixing, Recording)
 Some Need It Lonely (2016) (Percussion)
 A Lovejoy (2016) (Live and Programmed Drums, Synthesizer)
 Ensayo de un Desaparecido (2017) (Keyboards & Synths)
 Azul, Mis Dientes (2017) (Live and Programmed Drums, Synths)
 The Clouds Hill Tapes Parts I, II & III (2020) (Keyboards & Synths)

With Zechs Marquise 
 34:26 EP (2006)
 Our Delicate Stranded Nightmare (2008)
 Getting Paid (2011)

Guest appearances 
 Terra Incognita by Juliette Lewis (2009) (Clavinet, Synthesizer, Percussion)
 The Golden Age of Knowhere by Funeral Party (2011) (Keyboards)
 A Raw Youth by Le Butcherettes (2015) (Moog bass, Moog synthesizer, percussion)
 Halo Orbit by Halo Orbit (2016/2017)

References

External links 
 Official Zechs Marquise page
 Official Eureka the Butcher page
 SIGHT/SOUND/RHYTHM interview 2012

1983 births
Living people
Maracas players
People from Bayamón, Puerto Rico
Puerto Rican musicians
Puerto Rican percussionists
The Mars Volta members
Omar Rodriguez Lopez Group members